Mont-Sainte-Anne is a ski resort in eastern Canada, located in the town of Beaupré, Quebec, about  northeast of Quebec City.

For day skiing, there are 71 available downhill ski trails covering  the southern, northern and western sides of the mountain. For night skiing, there are 19 trails covering  the southern part of the mountain only. It is the highest vertical for night skiing in Canada.

History 
Ten trails and four lifts (including a gondola)  were featured on the mountain inauguration day  in 1966 on January 16. That year, the resort was already making its appearance on the world scene with the Du Maurier International, followed the next year by the first Canadian Winter Games.

Skiing at Mont-Sainte-Anne goes back to the 1940s though. Volunteers and skiers from Beaupré and Québec City, cut the first trail in the fall of 1943. Three years later, the first skiing competition was held, the competitors having to climb by foot up the mountain, bearing all their equipment. The only trail available was groomed "manually" by local volunteers using their skis while climbing up.

Since the mountain became privately owned in 1994 by Resorts of the Canadian Rockies, investments have been mostly aimed at cutting new gladed trails and improving the snowmaking system.

Numerous World Cup alpine races have been held at the mountain, last in December 1989. It has co-hosted the Junior World Championships three times; with Stoneham Mountain in 2000 and with Le Massif in 2006 and 2013.

In 2020-2022 (each), L’Étoile Filante Gondola had 3 incidents where cabins detached from the lift line, resulting in 11 injuries total.

Cross-country skiing
Mont-Sainte-Anne's Cross-Country Ski Centre features  of trails, including a  network for skating stride, which makes it the largest cross-country ski centre in Canada, and the second most significant in North America (after Royal Gorge, California).

Other activities
 Winter : Snowshoeing, dogsledding, paragliding, sleigh rides, ice skating, tubing, snowmobiling (nearby), spa.
 Summer: Campground, paragliding, hiking, golf, mountain biking.

See also
 Stoneham Mountain Resort
 Le Massif
 List of ski areas and resorts in Canada

References

External links

 
FIS-Ski.com - World Cup podiums at Mont-Sainte-Anne

Ski areas and resorts in Quebec
Geography of Capitale-Nationale
Tourist attractions in Capitale-Nationale